The Belgium vs Netherlands Cups were a series of international football friendly cup matches contested by the national teams of Belgium and the Netherlands. From their first unofficial friendly derbies in the early 1900s, until the mid-1920s, Belgium and the Netherlands competed for floating trophies. During the encounters in Belgium the teams played for the Coupe Vanden Abeele until 1925, while in the Netherlands they faced off for the Rotterdamsch Nieuwsblad Beker until 1923. In total, there has been 39 Belgian-Dutch friendly cup duels, of which 35 were official internationals.

The cup awarded in Belgium was named in honor of the donator of the trophy, Frédéric Vanden Abeele Sr., the father of the secretary of Beerschot Athletic Club (where the first tournament was held), in reaction to the successful staging of Brussels of the Coupe Van der Straeten Ponthoz one year earlier. As the Dutch disliked the design of the Belgian trophy, they quickly nicknamed it Het Koperen Dingetje, meaning "The Copper Thingy". 

These Belgian-Dutch friendly cups are among the oldest international football cups along with the 1904 Évence Coppée Trophy.

History

After the huge success of the first edition of the Coupe Van der Straeten Ponthoz in 1900, the plans for another international club tournament began, and in February 1901, the "Comité voor den beker-Vanden Abeele" invited a Dutch eleven to travel to Antwerp to contest the Coupe Vanden Abeele (offered by Frédéric Vanden Abeele) against an All-Belgium side during the Easter holiday. However, the Easter weekend was already planned for the second edition of the Coupe Van der Straeten Ponthoz in Brussels, so the match had to be delayed by three weeks, and since many Dutch clubs had league commitments on the new date, the visitors were eventually represented by Rotterdam club side Celeritas, a club from a third level competition. This side was strengthened by three players from another Rotterdam club, Olympia, which was also a third-level side. Naturally, the hosts, whose team was announced as an All-Belgium XI and included four Englishmen resident in Belgium, had little trouble claiming the Coupe Vanden Abeele after an 8–0, with the star of the match being the English man Herbert Potts, who netted 7 of the Belgian goals. Although the dirigents of this cup only intended to create another international club tournament, they instead had just witnessed what is now considered the first-ever (unofficial) match between Belgium and the Netherlands, held on 28 April 1901 at the ground of Beerschot A.C. in front of just 300 people. This match took place a year earlier than the first official international match played in continental Europe between Austria and Hungary on 12 October 1902. 

The next three editions saw the Dutch represented by sides selected and organized by Cees van Hasselt. As a result of the games not being sanctioned by the Royal Dutch Football Association (KNVB), only players from the second division were available to Van Hasselt, so Belgium also won those three editions, although with more leveled scores (1–0, 2–1 and 6–4). In those games the Netherlands was announced under the name of "Van Hasselt XI", while the hosts were no national side at all because of the presence of English players in the "Belgian" squad such as center-forward Herbert Potts, who scored 12 of "Belgium's" 17 goals. They really were a Belgian League XI.

In 1905 the Dutch football federation decided to take direct responsibility for the selection of the Dutch side, and so, on 30 April 1905, the Netherlands national team played their first official international game, beating Belgium 4–1 in Antwerp, courtesy of a four-goal haul from Eddy de Neve, thus winning the Coupe Vanden Abeele for the first time. Belgium was the first ever opponent of the Netherlands, but the opposite can't be said as Belgium's official debut came on 1 May 1904 against France at Évence Coppée Trophy.

Coupe Vanden Abeele

Unofficial Results (1901–1904)
The earliest four games played by a national selection of players active in Belgium, with the Netherlands as opponent between 1901 and 1904, were not yet considered as official because of the presence of English players in the "Belgian" squad.

1901

1902

1903

1904
Belgium had originally announced to field an exclusively Belgian squad, but eventually replaced Paul Chibert (injured) by Herbert Potts, who contributed decisively in Belgium's win, scoring four goals.

Official Results (1905–1925)

1905

1906

1907

1908

1909

1910

1911

1912

1913

1914

1921

1922

1924

1925

Coupe Vanden Abeele Statistics

Record

All-time top scorers

Rotterdamsch Nieuwsblad Beker

Official Results (1905–1923)

1905

1906

1907

1908

1909

1910

1911

1912

1913

1914

1922

1923

Rotterdamsch Nieuwsblad Beker Statistics

Record

All-time top scorers

General statistics

Overall record

General all-time top scorers

Hat-tricks
Since the first official tournament in 1905, a total of 6 hat-tricks have been scored in the 35 official cups. The first hat-trick was scored by Eddy de Neve of Netherlands, scoring 4 goals in a 4-1 win at the Coupe Vanden Abeele on 30 April 1905; and the last was by Mannes Francken, netting three goals also for the Netherlands in a 4-3 win at the Rotterdamsch Nieuwsblad Beker on 28 April 1912. The record for the most goals scored in a single match is 4, which has been achieved on just one occasion: by the Dutch Eddy de Neve at the 1904 Coupe Vanden Abeele, with three of his goals coming in extra-time. However, if we also include the unofficial matches, then the record is held by the Englishmen Herbert Potts of Belgium, who netted a whopping seven goals in an 8-0 win at the 1901 Coupe Vanden Abeele. Mannes Francken is the only player to have scored three hat-tricks in these friendly duels, two at RNBs (1910 and 1912) and one at the CVA (1911), which is a remarkable achievement since no one else has even scored two, sept for Herbert Potts if the unofficial games are considered. The Netherlands holds the record for most hat-tricks scored with 5, while Belgium only has 1, which was scored by Robert De Veen. On the other hand, the cups are perfectly balanced on hat-tricks, with each having three.

List

See also
Belgium national football team results (1904–1919)
Netherlands national football team results (1905–1919)

References

External links
Coupe Vanden Abeele results
Rotterdamsch Nieuwsblad-Beker results

Defunct international association football competitions in Europe
1922 establishments in Europe
Recurring sporting events established in 1904
Recurring sporting events disestablished in 1925
Football in Belgium
Football in the Netherlands